Halsey may refer to:

People
Halsey (surname), including a list of people
Halsey (singer) (born 1994), American singer and songwriter
Halsey baronets, a title in the Baronetage of the United Kingdom
Halsey Beshears, a Republican politician from Florida

Placenames in the United States
 Halsey, Oregon, city in Linn County
 Halsey, Nebraska, village in Blaine and Thomas counties
 Halsey, Wisconsin, town in Marathon County
 Halsey Brook, a creek in East Jewett, New York
 Halsey Street (disambiguation)

Other uses
, several United States Navy vessels
 "Uncle Albert/Admiral Halsey", Paul McCartney song referring to a U.S. Admiral
 Halsey Field House, multi-purpose arena at the United States Naval Academy, Annapolis, Maryland
 Halsey Institute of Contemporary Art, contemporary art institute within the School of the Arts at the College of Charleston, South Carolina
 Halsey, a menswear fashion company started by Robbie Rogers

See also
 Halsey House (disambiguation)